Labicymbium rancho is a species of sheet weaver found in Brazil. It was described by Ott & Lise in 1997.

References

Linyphiidae
Spiders described in 1997
Endemic fauna of Brazil
Spiders of Brazil